Elin Ek (born 28 December 1976 in Sundsvall, Sweden) is a radio and television actress who plays the character Grynet on Sveriges Television (SVT).

Grynet 
An alter ego similar to fellow Nordic personality Silvía Night, Elin Ek says that the character of Grynet just popped out of her head as an idea one day to do a parody on the typical Swedish teenager.

Grynet read Växjö's jury's votes in Melodifestivalen 2003, and was one of the hosts of the Second Chance round of Melodifestivalen 2004.

On Grynets Show on Sveriges Television (SVT), she meets Swedish stars like Zlatan Ibrahimović and the members of A*Teens and shares craft projects that viewers can make on their own like applying a new design on handbags with glitter.

The Grynets Show is SVT's highest rated shows for kids ever.

Radio
Elin Ek has been both a producer and a host of programs on Sveriges Radio. She hosted the P1 program Sommar on 5 July 2004. On P3, she has been involved with Ketchup, Sommartoppen i P3, and Lantz i P3. In January 2007 she began involvement with the new program P3 Bubbel.

References

External links
Grynets Show homepage(Swedish)

1976 births
Living people
Swedish actresses
Swedish women radio presenters
Women radio producers
Swedish television hosts
Sommar (radio program) hosts
People from Sundsvall
Swedish women television presenters